Kotva Department Store is a department store in Prague at the Náměstí Republiky (Republic Square). Its name, meaning anchor in English, comes from an older neighboring building.

It has been a member of the International Association of Department Stores from 1993 to 2000.

Historic build-up area 
On the site of the department store stood the Romanesque church of St. Benedict. Before the mid-13th century, there was a commandry of Prague Teutonic Knights which had a fortress character and was related to current fortifications built in the Old Town. Strahov premonstratensians in the 17th century established a campus Norbertinum here and a baroque church was rebuilt according to plans by Domenico Orsi, newly consecrated as St. Norbert. The church was demolished in the late 18th century due to the construction of the New Town noblewomen Institute. During the construction of the department store, valuable houses from the 19th and 20th century were demolished. Due to time pressure during construction, significant archeologic areas were lost.

Construction 
The Kotva department store was created between 1970 and 1975, designed by Czech architect couple Věra Machoninová and Vladimir Machonin. It was built by the Swedish construction company SIAB, which was at that time very unusual. The floor plan consists of multiple intertwined hexagons. Kotva has five stories above ground, a total of ten interconnected escalators (two shafts of five escalators) and about the same number underground, serving as a garage and supermarket. It was intended to become a symbol of abundance and wealth in socialism. At the time of construction it was the largest department store in the Czechoslovak Socialist Republic. Kotva did not avoid supply problems, which showed the weakness of the country's economy. Until the 1990s, the store offered a diverse range of products, today its focus is on clothing and fashion goods.

Monument declaration 
In 2007, architectural historian Rostislav Švácha suggested the Ministry of Culture declare the building a cultural monument because it represents a highpoint in Czech architecture of the first half of the 1970s and its visual and structural concept is peculiarly dealing with the suggestions of several directions in the post-war world of architecture. A similar architectural character began to be used before the Second World War by Frank Lloyd Wright. This request failed.

In April 2019, Kotva Department Store became a Czech cultural monument, following a 2016 request for it to be added to the list.

References

External links 

Shopping malls in Prague
Buildings and structures in Prague
Tourist attractions in Prague
Retail buildings in the Czech Republic
Brutalist architecture in the Czech Republic
National Cultural Monuments of the Czech Republic
1975 establishments in Czechoslovakia
Shopping malls established in 1975
20th-century architecture in the Czech Republic